WOWN (99.3 FM) is a radio station broadcasting a classic hits format. Licensed to Shawano, Wisconsin, United States, the station serves the Green Bay area.  Depending on conditions, WOWN can be heard as far east as Manistee, Michigan. The station is currently owned by Results Broadcasting Inc. and features programming from Jones Radio Network and Motor Racing Network.  Original call letters were WTCH-FM.

WOWN broadcasts from a transmitter 10 miles northwest of Pulaski. Its studios are located in a Chrysler/Dodge/Jeep dealership just south of Pulaski.

References

External links

OWN
Classic hits radio stations in the United States